Harit Nagpal (born 2 November 1961) is the Managing Director and Chief Executive Officer of Tata Play, formerly known as Tata Sky, since August 2010. He has over three decades of experience in the industry.

Career

Prior to Tata Play/Tata Sky, Nagpal worked with Hutch/Orange/Vodafone in various capacities for 9 years. He has also worked with other brands such as Shoppers Stop, Pepsi, Marico and Lakme.

He took over as Managing Director and Chief Executive Officer of Tata Sky in August 2010. 
Before that He was Director Marketing at Vodafone Global. 
He also served as Director of Marketing and Business at Vodafone India Limited.

Early life

Nagpal completed a BE in Chemical Engineering from Panjab University, Chandigarh in 1983 and an MBA from Faculty of Management Studies, University of Delhi in 1985.

References

1961 births
Living people
Indian chief executives
Faculty of Management Studies – University of Delhi alumni
Delhi University alumni
Tata Group people